Lyria lyraeformis is a species of sea snail, a marine gastropod mollusk in the family Volutidae, the volutes.

Description
Fully adult shells can attain a size of 140 mm.

Distribution
Somalia area of East Africa.

References

Volutidae
Gastropods described in 1821